Muhannad Ahmed Abu Radeah Assiri (born 14 October 1986) is a retired Saudi Arabian professional footballer who plays as a striker for Al-Shabab and the Saudi Arabia national team.

On 7 August 2021, Assiri announced his retirement from football.

International career
In May 2018, he was named in Saudi Arabia’s preliminary squad for the 2018 FIFA World Cup in Russia.

Career statistics

Club

International
Statistics accurate as of match played 25 June 2018.

International goals
Scores and results list Saudi Arabia's goal tally first.

Honours
Al-Shabab
King Cup: 2014

Al-Ahli
Saudi Crown Prince Cup: 2014–15
Saudi Professional League: 2015–16
King Cup: 2016
Saudi Super Cup: 2016

References

External links
Assiri statistics with clubs
Assiri statistics with national team

1986 births
Living people
People from 'Asir Province
Association football forwards
Saudi Arabian footballers
Saudi Arabia international footballers
Muhayil Club players
Al-Wehda Club (Mecca) players
Al-Shabab FC (Riyadh) players
Al-Ahli Saudi FC players
Saudi First Division League players
Saudi Professional League players
2018 FIFA World Cup players